Ancona is a city in Italy.

Ancona may also refer to:

Places
 Province of Ancona, the Italian province that includes the city
 Ancona, Victoria, a town in Australia
 Ancona, Alberta, a locale in Canada
 Ancona, Illinois, a town in the US

Ships
  (1966–2010), a ferry operated on a service linking Ancona, Italy to Split, Croatia
  (1913), a light cruiser of the Imperial German Navy, ceded to Italy and renamed RN Ancona, 1919–1937
  (1908–1915), Italian passenger steamer, sunk by a U-boat during World War I
 SS Arabia (1897), renamed Barcelona 1899, seized by Italy and renamed SS Ancona, 1915–1924

Other
 Ancona (surname)
 Ancona chicken, a breed of chicken
 Ancona duck, a breed of duck